Jonny McGovern (born July 12, 1976), also known by his character name The Gay Pimp, is an American stand-up comedian, actor, musician and podcaster. He has recorded three albums as comedic singer The Gay Pimp, appeared as a cast member of Logo's The Big Gay Sketch Show, and hosts the internet talk show Hey Qween!

Early life
Jonny McGovern was born to Mary McGovern and Rob Gutowski in Brooklyn, New York. His parents traveled often and McGovern grew up primarily in Egypt and Thailand. McGovern later returned to the United States to study acting at Boston University, where he earned a BFA. He is openly gay.

Career
McGovern stated that he was inspired to create his signature comedic character, The Gay Pimp, after listening to rap songs and interviews by Eminem. McGovern has said,

After the songs from the show began to get heavy rotation in New York City nightclubs, McGovern was approached about making a music video for one of his songs, "Soccer Practice".

The success of the single garnered attention for McGovern, and he contributed commentary on a variety of VH1 shows (such as Best Week Ever, Totally Gay, and 40 Dumbest Celebrity Quotes) as well as earned a slot on Comedy Central's all-gay comedy show Out on the Edge, hosted by Alan Cumming.

McGovern hosts his own YouTube show on StreamTV titled Hey Qween!, where he interviews various icons of the LGBT community. The show was co-hosted up until 2020 by the late Lady Red Couture. As a tribute to her passing, McGovern released the 3-track EP Flowers (Songs to Lady Red) in November 2020, with Adam Joseph as producer.

McGovern hosts Gay Pimpin' with Jonny McGovern, a weekly free LGBT themed podcast based out of Los Angeles since August 2010. It was based in New York City from January 16, 2006 to January 11, 2010.

Discography

Note:
In the twelfth episode of the third season of Queer as Folk, Soccer Practice can be seen and heard in the background of the bar scene at about 18 minutes into the episode.
"Soccer Practice" is played in the HBO vampire series True Blood in the third episode of season one. McGovern mentioned it on his weekly podcast and says he highly approves.
Artist and raconteur Robert W. Richards drew the album cover for Gays Gone Wild.
The photographs used on Jonny McGovern's site and ReMix album where shot by Dick Mitchel.
 By June 2007, the song "Somethin' For The Fellas (That Like the Fellas)" had held the top spot on Logo's The Click List: Top 10 Videos for over 15 weeks
 The video for "Don't Fall in Love With a Homo (A Song for the Ladies)" was released on May 1, 2008 with 25,000 views in the first day. It eventually hit number 1 on Logo's Click List and stayed there for 6 weeks.
McGovern's gay parody video of "Like A G6" with transgender diva Calpernia Addams called "Likin Big Dicks" had over 400,000 views, and a club remix was produced by NYC electro-group Naked Highway.
McGovern's spoof of Duck Sauce's "Barbra Streisand" dance track entitled "Marla Gibbs" (honoring the star of 227) was mentioned several times by Andy Cohen on Bravo's Watch What Happens Live!
He also has a web series  "Celebrity Donkey Punch" which comes out bi monthly.

References

External links
GayPimp.com The Official Jonny McGovern Website

Jonny McGovern's MySpace

1975 births
American male comedians
American Internet celebrities
American male singer-songwriters
American podcasters
American sketch comedians
American stand-up comedians
American male pop singers
Boston University College of Fine Arts alumni
American gay actors
American gay musicians
Gay comedians
Gay singers
Gay composers
American LGBT singers
American LGBT songwriters
Gay songwriters
Living people
Music promoters
Musicians from Brooklyn
Singer-songwriters from New York (state)
21st-century American comedians
21st-century American singers
21st-century American male singers
House of Aviance
20th-century American LGBT people
21st-century American LGBT people
American LGBT comedians
American gay writers